Luis Amado (born 4 May 1976 in Arganda del Rey, Madrid) is a Spanish futsal player who plays for Inter Movistar as a goalkeeper.

Honours

135 times international
6 League Championships (98/99, 01/02, 02/03, 03/04, 04/05, 07/08)
7 Cup Championships (97/98, 98/99, 99/00, 03/04, 04/05, 06/07, 08/09)
9 Supercups (98/99, 99/00, 00/01, 01/02, 02/03, 03/04, 05/06, 07/08, 08/09)
3 UEFA Futsal Cup (99/00, 03/04, 05/06)
5 Intercontinental Cups (2000, 2005, 2006, 2007, 2008)
1 Recopa of Europe (2008)
2 cups Iberian (03/04, 05/06)
2 World Championships (00 Guatemala, Taiwan Taipei 04)
1 runner World Cup  (Brazil 2008)
5 UEFA Futsal Championship (2001, 2005, 2007, 2010, 2012)
Runner Euro (Spain 99)
FIFA Champion Tournament (Singapore 01)
Centenary Tournament Champion R. Madrid (Torrejon 02)
Voted Best European Goalkeeper Picks (Russia 01)
1 Having chosen Best Player of the LNFS (07/08)
7 Times Voted Best Goalkeeper of the LNFS (98/99, 99/00, 00/01, 03/04, 04/05, 06/07, 07/08)
Best goalkeeper of the World 2003-2004 season

External links
Official website
Luis Amado su FutsalPlanet.com

1976 births
Living people
Futsal goalkeepers
Sportspeople from Madrid
Spanish men's futsal players
Inter FS players
Caja Segovia FS players